Go Faster is the sixteenth official studio album by guitarist/vocalist Richie Kotzen. While Go Faster was only released in US, the album was released in Europe and Japan under different name called Return of the Mother Head's Family Reunion with different cover and distinct songs order plus a bonus track.

A video of "Chase It" was shot in the summer of 2008 in Venice, Italy.

Track listing

Personnel
 Richie Kotzen – vocals, guitar, mandolin
 Arlan Schierbaum – hammond A-100 organ, Wurlitzer & rhodes electric pianos, clavinet, minimoog, oberheim 2 voice, mellotron, chamberlin, acoustic piano, Yamaha E-70
 Virgil McKoy – bass
 Franklin Vanderbilt – drums and percussion
 August Kotzen – additional background vocals (on "Go Faster", "Can You Feel It", "Faith", "You Know That")
 Lole Diro – recording engineer, mixing
 Dave Donnelly – mastering at DNA Mastering studios

Videography

References

Richie Kotzen albums
2007 albums